Agonopterix omelkoi is a moth in the family Depressariidae. It was described by Alexandr L. Lvovsky in 1985. It is found in the Russian Far East.

References

Moths described in 1985
Agonopterix
Moths of Asia